is a 1998 Japanese kaiju film directed by Okihiro Yoneda, written by Masumi Suetani, and produced by Shōgo Tomiyama. Produced and distributed by Toho Studios, it is the final film in the Rebirth of Mothra trilogy, following the previous year's Rebirth of Mothra II.

Rebirth of Mothra III stars Megumi Kobayashi, Misato Tate, Aki Hano, Atsushi Ohnita, and Miyuki Matsuda, and features the fictional giant monster characters Mothra and King Ghidorah. The film was released theatrically in Japan on December 12, 1998, and was released in the United States as a Sci-Fi Channel TV premiere on May 31, 2003. However, despite its predecessors being released on DVD in 2000, the film did not receive a North American home media release until 2014 when all three films were released on a Blu-ray bundle by Sony Pictures Home Entertainment.

Plot

The Elias sisters, Moll and Lora, attempt to stop their vengeful sister, Belvera, from stealing the Elias triangle, three power units that can transform the sisters' daggers into powerful swords. Belvera succeeds, but is thwarted by her sisters' pet, Fairy Mothra, and fails to retrieve the proper unit for her dagger while Moll and Lora end up with one for the former.

The next day, preteen Shota ditches school to investigate a meteor that recently landed just as children from across the city mysteriously vanish. Moll and Lora examine the meteor's remains and deduces that the evil King Ghidorah, a three-headed space dragon who visited Earth in its past and destroyed the dinosaurs, has returned, captured the children, and placed them inside an organic dome. Mothra Leo, summoned by Moll and Lora, arrives to battle Ghidorah, but gets overpowered and retreats. Moll and Lora encounter Ghidorah, who hypnotizes the latter and forces her to attack Moll, attempting to drag both into the dome, but Fairy saves Moll. Intrigued by Ghidorah's arrival, Belvera investigates, but gets dragged into the dome.

As the space dragon wreaks havoc, Moll meets Shota, who learned his siblings Shuehei and Tamako were captured as well and tells him about Ghidorah's plan to feed on the children's life force. She convinces him to accompany her to see Leo. Communicating telepathically, Moll and Leo devise a plan, wherein Leo transforms into Light Speed Mothra and travels back in time to confront a younger Ghidorah with Moll's help.

Meanwhile, Moll gives Shota her sword and asks him to go inside the dome to find Lora and convince her to help Leo. After Shota reluctantly agrees, Moll, depleted of her powers after sending Leo to the past, falls into a state of suspended animation. Inside the dome, a worried Belvera encounters Lora and tells her that Ghidorah plans to destroy Earth. Still under Ghidorah's spell, Lora takes Belvera's unit, transforms her dagger, and engages her sister in combat. Belvera begs Lora to see reason and work with her, but to no avail. Shota finds Lora, but she attacks him. Belvera tries to stop her while Shota reminds Lora of who she is. Ghidorah's spell then breaks and Lora collapses, her sword combining with Moll's. Discovering the Elias triangle represents her and her sisters, Belvera uses the last unit to transform her dagger and combine her sword with Moll and Lora's in an attempt to break the dome. As the dome shakes violently, Shota realizes Leo is losing and asks the recovering Lora to help him. Lora sends her powers to Leo, and he recovers and immobilizes Ghidorah, dropping him into an erupting volcano, though not before a severed piece of Ghidorah's tail burrows itself underground. Grievously injured, Leo crashes to the ground. However, three primitive Mothra larvae wrap him in a cocoon time capsule.

In the present, Ghidorah and the dome disappear, freeing the captives. Shota reunites with his siblings and join Belvera and Lora as they stand vigil over Moll. Suddenly, a new Ghidorah, having regenerated from the severed tail, emerges and recaptures the children. Belvera and Lora then join forces in an attempt to stop Ghidorah long enough for Leo to return and reemerge as Armor Mothra and disintegrate Ghidorah in the ensuing battle. He then tells Belvera and Lora to channel their powers through their sword to revive Moll. The Elias do as they are told and succeed, resulting in a touching reunion for the sisters, though Belvera flies off shortly after. The children are released once more and reunite with their parents. Shota, Shuehei, Tamako, and their parents watch as the Elias, Fairy, and Leo, now Eternal Mothra, fly off into the sunset.

Cast
 Megumi Kobayashi as Moll
 Misato Tate as Lora
 Aki Hano as Belvera
 Atsushi Ohnita as Father
 Miyuki Matsuda as Mother
 Kôichi Ueda as Kôchô

Home media
Blu-ray Sony (Toho Godzilla Collection) 

Aspect Ratio: 1.85:1 (1080p) [AVC]
Soundtrack(s): Japanese and English (DTS-HD 2.0 Stereo)
Subtitles: English, English SDH and French
Extras: 
 Theatrical Trailer (1080i, 2:04)
 Teaser 1 (1080i, 0:23)
 Teaser 2 (1080i, 1:14)
Notes: Comes with Rebirth of Mothra and Rebirth of Mothra II. This film shares a disc with the second film, while the first has its own.

References

External links

1998 films
1998 fantasy films
1990s monster movies
Films directed by Okihiro Yoneda
Films set in 1999
Films about dragons
Films set in Tokyo
Films set in Osaka
Films set in Nagoya
Films set in Kyoto
Films set in Yamanashi Prefecture
Giant monster films
Japan in fiction
1990s Japanese-language films
Japanese sequel films
Kaiju films
Mothra
Films about time travel
Films about dinosaurs
Films scored by Toshiyuki Watanabe
1990s Japanese films